The Anoka County Sheriff's Office is the sheriff's office of Anoka County, Minnesota, in the United States. The ACSO is the 4th largest county in the State of Minnesota. It currently serves at least 400,000 residents and is headquartered in Andover. The ACSO comprises 21 cities and townships and is part of the seven-county Metropolitan area. Their services include crime prevention,  providing assistance to crime victims, and providing firearms permits. Brad Wise is the current Sheriff and has been the Sheriff of Anoka County since 2023. The office is organized into six individual divisions including Administration, Justice Services, Jail, Patrol, Criminal Investigations (CID), and Midwest Regional Forensic Laboratory.

Administration 

This division of the ACSO watches over the day-to-day operations, it provides human resources to customers, and it also oversees the financial and fleet management for the office. The functions of Administration include The Professional Standards Unit and The Training Unit. The PSU is in charge of insuring that the employees of the ACSO comply with the professional standards. The TU is responsible for establishing and scheduling training for all Sheriffs Office employees as well as sworn officers county wide. The training is performed in conjunction with the Anoka County Law Enforcement Training Center. Some of the duties include background and internal affairs investigations.

Justice Services 

This division is in charge of records, warrants, civil processing, court security, and prisoner transports.

Civil Unit - This part of the division helps enforce the district court serving court orders. Almost 7,500 papers are served every year. 
Warrants - Warrants vigorously seek out and capture individuals who have a warrant that is active.
Court Security - This unit protects staff and visitors in the court rooms, and it makes sure that those in court follow instructions. Every year, this unit provides 26,000 hours of in court security in order to keep citizens safe. 
Prisoner Transport - This transporting system helps transport court orders, warrants, extraditions, and prisoners. These transport services offer details to help guard the prisoners. This unit provides almost 3.000 transports every year by traveling 130,000 miles across the country.

Jail 

The jail of Anoka County is located in Downtown Anoka, and is a 238 bed detention center for criminals who have become incarcerated because of a criminal offense. This jail is the primary adult booking building for all departments within the Anoka County area. Annually, the jail takes in over 10,000 people and the jail houses many individuals for the United States Marshal Service. More responsibilities of the jail include being in charge of the electronic posting of all issued warrants, providing the status of warrants to the law enforcement agencies, and clearing out warrants that are over and have already been served. Every year, the jail goes through over 6,000 warrants.

Patrol 

This division of the ACSO provides services to one township and seven cities in the Northern part of Anoka County. The Patrol division maintains contact services with the cities of Andover, Bethel, Columbus, East Bethel, Ham Lake, Linwood Township, Nowthen, and Oak Grove. They respond to over 35,000 calls per year and they are responsible for 244 square miles of service converge. Additional services that the Patrol division take care of are:

Recreational Unit
School Resource/Liaison Officers (SRO)
SWAT Team
K-9 Unit
Investigations Unit
Crime Watch
Dive Team
Reserve Unit

Criminal Investigations 

Criminal Investigations handle things like sexual assault, homicide, and other suspicious death cases that occur in the Anoka County area. Some other areas of investigation include child maltreatment, welfare, fraud, computer forensics, and polygraph services. The division operates the Anoka-Hennepin Narcotics and Violent Crimes Task Force. Annually the division handles over 1,600 felony cases, including over 500 sexual assaults. The Criminal Investigations department has a Crime Lab. This lab provides services to all agencies in Anoka County by processing crime scenes for evidence. The crime scene unit processes over 500 crimes annually.

Midwest Regional Forensics Laboratory 

This laboratory offers services to local law enforcement agencies within the counties of Anoka, Sherburne, and Wright in the forensic disciplines of latent prints, drug chemistry, blood/urine alcohol testing and DNA analysis.

Notable incidents 

In late May 2020, the Anoka County Sheriff's Department was involved in policing the George Floyd protests in Minneapolis–Saint Paul. The department slashed tyres of unoccupied vehicles parked near protests, admitting their involvement around a week later.

Sheriffs of Anoka County 
1857-1858 J.C. Frost - appointed
Elected:
1858-1862 Thomas Henderson
1862-1864 W.G. Randolph
1864-1868 Thomas Henderson
1868-1872 James Frost
1872-1874 M.V. Bean
1874-1884 James Frost
1884-1892 Charles W. Lenfist
1892-1898 John Tierney
1898-1900 George W. Merill
1900-1902 John Tierney
1902-1909 John Palmer
1909-1914 John Casey
1914-1930 U.S. "Red" Pratt
1930-1946 O.M. "Oscar" Olson
1946-1960 L.A. "Mike" Auspos
1960-1987 Ralph "Buster" Talbot
1987-1995 Ken Wilkinson
1995-2002 Larry Podany
2002-2011 Bruce Andersohn
2011–2023 James Stuart
2023-Present Brad Wise

References

Anoka County, Minnesota
1857 establishments in Minnesota Territory
Sheriffs' departments of Minnesota